The Wolverine "B" Conference (known commonly as the Wolverine Conference) is a high school athletic conference in southwestern Michigan. It is composed of 8 Class A and B schools from the MHSAA in Allegan, Cass, Kalamazoo, St. Joseph, and Van Buren counties.  Current members include:  Edwardsburg, Niles, Otsego, Paw Paw, Plainwell, Sturgis, Three Rivers and Vicksburg.

Membership

Current members

Former members

Membership Timeline (since 1952)

History 
Early Days (1952-1960)

The Wolverine Conference was formed in 1952, consisting of Allegan, Western State High (Kalamazoo), Otsego, Plainwell, Portage, and South Haven. Five boys sports were sponsored by the league that first year:  football, basketball, baseball, tennis and track.  Girls sports were added in the 1973-74 year with basketball, tennis, softball and track being the sponsored sports.  Portage left for the SMAC in 1958. The Wolverine expanded for the first time in 1954, adding Vicksburg to the conference. The Wolverine "B" Conference has always consisted of mostly Class B high schools, but there are bylaws in case a school is Class A for more than two years. In that instance, over 75% of schools must approve said school's membership and the school's case is reviewed every year.

Further Expansion (1960-2005)

The Wolverine began adding more schools beginning in the 1960s. Paw Paw High School was the first to join in this decade, moving from the Kalamazoo Valley Conference in 1961. Kalamazoo University High closed in 1966, with Comstock joining the same year from the Kalamazoo Valley Conference, and Three Rivers from the Twin Valley Conference a year after in 1967. Gull Lake High School joined the conference in 1974. This kicked off a long period of stability within the Wolverine, with the only exception being Paw Paw returning to the Kalamazoo Valley in 1982.

Major Realignment (2006–present)

The new millennium brought major changes to the Wolverine Conference. In 2006, Paw Paw left the Kalamazoo Valley and once again rejoined the Wolverine, while Dowagiac joined the conference from the SMAC. Five years later, Gull Lake, dominant in many sports, left for the SMAC. Looking into expanding, the Wolverine raided the nearby Lakeland Conference, with Berrien Springs, Coloma, and Edwardsburg entering the conference. This, for the first time, created divisions within the Wolverine, with the alignment as follows from 2012 through 2014:

Then, after the 2014 school year, Comstock left the Wolverine for the Kalamazoo Valley, replaced by Sturgis from the SMAC. To accommodate these changes, Paw Paw and Three Rivers switched divisions, making new divisions for the 2014-15 year as follows:

After the 2014–15 school year, Coloma and Berrien Springs, two of the smaller schools in the Wolverine, left for the Southwestern Athletic Conference and the BCS Conference, respectively, after only three seasons in the conference. This created a full 9-game football schedule for the conference, eliminating the need to have divisions after only three seasons. For the next five years, the conference remained the same, until South Haven, one of the founding members of the Wolverine, announced it will leave after 68 years for the BCS after the 2019–20 school year, leaving the conference at 9 teams in 2020. Niles became a member in 2021-22 returning the league membership to ten. This arrangement lasted one year, as Dowagiac decided to leave the conference after the 2021–22 school year, citing its significant enrollment gap with other conference schools.

Current Champions 

‡ Denotes state champion

† All spring 2020 sports were cancelled due to the COVID-19 pandemic

References

Michigan high school sports conferences